Socialist March (Sosialistiki Poreia) was a Greek short-lived political party founded in 1975 by former members of PASOK who was expelled due to their disagreement with the party's leader, Andreas Papandreou. In 1977, it participated in Progress and Left Forces Alliance, a coalition of small left-wing parties. In 1979 the party was dissolved.

Social democratic parties in Greece
1975 establishments in Greece
Defunct political parties in Greece